Nicolás Pino Leon (born 21 September 2004) is a Chilean racing driver who currently competes in the European Le Mans Series.

Early Career

Karting 
Pino began his racing career in Karting at the age of 8 in Santiago de Chile until the age of 13 when he moved to compete on the European and World karting scene.

Lower formulae 
After Karting Pino progressed into Formula 4 making appearances in the Formula 4 South East Asia Championship before switching for half season of the prestigious  F4 British Championship. 

Since then Pino has made one-off appearances in the Euroformula Open Championship which uses the driving the Dallara Formula 3 (F320) car

Prototype and Endurance racing 
Towards the end of 2021 Nico made the full time switch to prototype and endurance racing with the aim of competing in Le Mans 24h. He was the youngest driver to enter a race by the time he made his LMP3 debut in Spa Francorchamps with Inter Europol Competition being the teammate of Moto GP rider Matteo Passini.

European Le Mans Series 
For 2022, Nico embarked on a full-season campaign in the European Le Mans Series, competing with Inter Europol Competition. He was joined by drivers Ghuilerme Oliveira and Charles Crews in the LMP3 Class. Nico scored 3 wins and finished 2nd overall in the championship.

Daytona 24h 
In 2022 Nico participated in the Daytona 24h where he classified 2nd on his first time competing in this event, however the car had to be retired later in the race due to an incident with one of the teammates.

Le Mans 
Nico participated in the Le Mans LMP3 race from the Michelin Le Man Cup by RLR MSport. He was called as a last minute replacement 2 days before the event and had to fly overnight from Chile.

IMSA SportsCar Championship 
During the course of the European Le Mans Series 2022 season he was called by the front running team Sean Creech Motorsport to race the Petit Le Mans round of the IMSA SportsCar Championship - LMP3

Racing record

Racing career summary 

† As Pino was a guest driver, he was ineligible to score points.
* Season still in progress.

Complete Euroformula Open Championship results 
(key) (Races in bold indicate pole position; races in italics indicate points for the fastest lap of top ten finishers)

Complete European Le Mans Series results 
(key) (Races in bold indicate pole position; results in italics indicate fastest lap)

Complete WeatherTech SportsCar Championship results
(key) (Races in bold indicate pole position; results in italics indicate fastest lap)

References

External links 
 
 

Living people
2004 births
Chilean racing drivers
Euroformula Open Championship drivers
Drivex drivers
European Le Mans Series drivers
Asian Le Mans Series drivers
WeatherTech SportsCar Championship drivers
Team Meritus drivers
British F4 Championship drivers
Double R Racing drivers
Le Mans Cup drivers